Murillo de Calahorra is a ghost town in the municipality of Calahorra, in the province and autonomous community of La Rioja, Spain.

References 

Populated places in La Rioja (Spain)